Mitrasacme  is a genus of plants in the family Loganiaceae. Around 40 species occur, mostly in Australia, though also extending to various parts of Asia and the Pacific Islands. Two species also occur in China.

The name comes from the Greek, alluding to “the highest point of the mitre”. As the fruit capsule has an alleged resemblance to a mitre.

Selected species
 Mitrasacme alsinoides
 Mitrasacme ambigua
 Mitrasacme connata
 Mitrasacme epigaea
 Mitrasacme exserta
 Mitrasacme foliosa
 Mitrasacme paradoxa
 Mitrasacme paludosa
 Mitrasacme pilosa
 Mitrasacme polymorpha
 Mitrasacme serpyllifolia

References

Loganiaceae
Gentianales genera